The 2019 United States Mixed Doubles Curling Championship was held from February 27-March 3, 2019 at the Granite Curling Club in Seattle, Washington. Cory Christensen and John Shuster won the tournament, earning the right to represent the United States at the 2019 World Mixed Doubles Curling Championship in Stavanger, Norway.

Qualification 
Nine teams qualified for the championship based on their performance on the World Curling Tour:

 Sarah Anderson and Korey Dropkin
 Becca Hamilton and Matt Hamilton
 Monica Walker and Alex Leichter
Vicky Persinger and Chris Plys
 Em Good and Mac Guy
 Jamie Sinclair and Sean Beighton
 Tabitha Peterson and Joe Polo
 Cory Christensen and John Shuster
 Nina Roth and Kroy Nernberger

The remaining three teams qualified through the 2019 USA Curling Mixed Doubles Challenge Round:

 Maureen Stolt and Peter Stolt
 Taylor Anderson and Derrick McLean
 Clare Moores and Lance Wheeler

Challenge round 
The 2019 USA Curling Mixed Doubles Challenge Round was held December 19 to 23, 2018 at the Grand Forks Curling Club in Grand Forks, North Dakota. Ten teams competed in triple-knockout tournament, with the top three teams earning a spot at the Championship. Husband and wife duo Peter and Maureen Stolt were the first to clinch one of the available berths when they defeated Taylor Anderson and Derrick McLean in the 'A' bracket final. Anderson and McLean then dropped down to the 'B' bracket final where they had another opportunity to earn one of the final two berths, which they did when they defeated Ann Podoll and Nathan Parry. Losing the 'B' bracket final knocked Podoll and Parry down to the 'C' bracket semifinals. Podoll and Parry made it through their semifinal match to face Clare Moores and Lance Wheeler in the 'C' bracket final. Tied at 7-7 after eight ends, Moores and Wheeler scored one in the extra end to secure the final team slot at the Mixed Doubles Championship.

Teams
The following 12 teams qualified for the event:

Round robin

Standings
{| table
|valign=top width=10%|

Teams highlighted in yellow qualified for the playoffs.

Game results

Draw 1
Wednesday, February 27, 7:00 pm

Draw 2
Thursday, February 28, 10:00 am

Draw 3
Thursday, February 28, 2:30 pm

Draw 4
Thursday, February 28, 7:00 pm

Draw 5
Friday, March 1, 10:00 am

Draw 6
Friday, March 1, 2:30 pm

Draw 7
Friday, March 1, 7:00 pm

Playoffs
The playoffs consisted of a 6-team bracket with the top two teams receiving byes in the quarterfinals.

Bracket

Quarterfinals
Saturday, March 2, 2:30pm

Semifinals
Saturday, March 2, 7:00pm

Finals
Sunday, March 3, 11:00am

References

United States National Curling Championships
Curling in Washington (state)
Sports competitions in Seattle
Curling, United States Women's
Curling, United States Mixed
Curling, United States Mixed
Curling, United States Mixed
United States